Savo Township is a township in Brown County, South Dakota, United States. As of the 2010 Census, it had a population of 71.

References

Townships in Brown County, South Dakota
Townships in South Dakota